Dragan Paljić (born 8 April 1983) is a former professional footballer who played as a left winger.

Career
Paljić was born in Starnberg, West Germany. He was a member of the 1899 Hoffenheim squad that won promotion to the 2. Bundesliga and 2010 the promotion with 1. FC Kaiserslautern to the Bundesliga. He also played for 1. FC Kaiserslautern and Wisła Kraków. In July 2012, he signed with Heracles Almelo in the Dutch Eredivisie. On 13 January 2014, signed for Australian A-League club Perth Glory FC.

Personal life
His family is from Doboj, Bosnia and Herzegovina. He is of Bosnian Serb descent.

Career statistics

Honours 
1. FC Kaiserslautern
 2. Bundesliga: 2009–10

Wisła Kraków
 Ekstraklasa: 2010–11

Individual
 Verbandsliga top scorer: 2003–04

References

External links
 
 Voetbal International profile 

1983 births
Living people
German people of Bosnia and Herzegovina descent
People from Starnberg
Sportspeople from Upper Bavaria
German footballers
Footballers from Bavaria
Association football midfielders
Eredivisie players
2. Bundesliga players
Ekstraklasa players
A-League Men players
TSG 1899 Hoffenheim players
TSV 1860 Munich II players
1. FC Kaiserslautern players
Wisła Kraków players
Heracles Almelo players
Perth Glory FC players
German people of Serbian descent
German expatriate footballers
German expatriate sportspeople in Poland
Expatriate footballers in Poland
German expatriate sportspeople in the Netherlands
Expatriate footballers in the Netherlands
German expatriate sportspeople in Australia
Expatriate soccer players in Australia